The 1970–71 Indiana Pacers season was Indiana's fourth season in the American Basketball Association and fourth as a team.

1970 ABA Draft

Roster

Season standings

Eastern Division

Western Division

Awards, records, and honors
Mel Daniels (averaged 21.0 points, 18.0 rebounds, and 2.2 assists) won the ABA MVP award for the second time in four years; he last won the award in the 1968–69 ABA season. Mel Daniels also won the ABA All-Star Game MVP

ABA All-Stars
Roger Brown
Mel Daniels
Bob Netolicky

Team leaders

Playoffs
Western Division Semifinals vs Memphis Pros

Western Division Finals vs Utah Stars

References

Indiana Pacers seasons
Indiana
Indiana Pacers
Indiana Pacers